Dole House may refer to:

James D. Dole Homestead, Waipahu, Hawaii, NRHP-listed
Dole-Little House, Newbury, Massachusetts, a house museum
Dole House (Lockport, New York), NRHP-listed
Dole-Darrell House, Portsmouth, Ohio, NRHP-listed in Scioto County